"Style" is a song by British girl group Mis-Teeq. It was written by Stargate duo Mikkel Eriksen and Tor Erik Hermansen, along with Hallgeir Rustan, and band member Alesha Dixon for the re-release edition of their second album, Eye Candy (2003). The song contains replayed elements of "West End Girls" (1984) by English synth-pop duo Pet Shop Boys. Due to the inclusion of the sample, Neil Tennant and Chris Lowe are also credited as songwriters.

The track marked the third and final single from Eye Candy and was also one of the last singles released by the group following the breakdown of their record label Telstar Records and the band's subsequent split in 2005. Upon its release, "Style" debuted and peaked at number 13 on the UK Singles Chart, becoming the group's only single not to enter the top 10. "Style" also reached number 18 in Finland, becoming the group's second and most successful single on the Finnish chart.

Track listings

Notes
  denotes additional producer
Sample credits
 "Style" contains replayed elements of "West End Girls" as performed by The Pet Shop Boys.

Personnel and credits 
Credits adapted from the liner notes of Eye Candy.

 Alesha Dixon – vocals, writer
 Robert "L.B." Dorsey – engineer
 Mikkel S. Eriksen – producer, writer
 Tor Erik Hermansen – producer, writer
 Su-Elise Nash – vocals
 Lawrence Johnson – additional producer

 Chris Lowe – writer (sample)
 Hallgeir Rustan – producer, writer
 Neil Tennant – writer (sample)
 Neil Tucker – engineer
 Sabrina Washington – vocals
 Anne Judith Wiik – additional vocals

Charts

Release history

References

2003 singles
2003 songs
Mis-Teeq songs
Song recordings produced by Stargate (record producers)
Songs written by Alesha Dixon
Songs written by Chris Lowe
Songs written by Mikkel Storleer Eriksen
Songs written by Neil Tennant
Songs written by Sabrina Washington
Songs written by Su-Elise Nash
Songs written by Tor Erik Hermansen
Telstar Records singles